Speaking Tiger Books (informally Speaking Tiger) is an independent publishing and book distribution company based in New Delhi, India. It was founded in 2014 by Ravi Singh and Manas Saikia, former heads of Penguin India and Cambridge University Press India, respectively. The company focuses on maintaining a diversity of genres and publishes Indian and international literary fiction and non-fiction.

References

External links
 Official website

2014 establishments in Delhi
Organizations established in 2014
Publishing companies established in 2014
Companies based in New Delhi
Book publishing companies of India